Crina Violeta Serediuc (born 3 January 1971) is a Romanian rower. She competed in the women's quadruple sculls event at the 2000 Summer Olympics.

References

1971 births
Living people
Romanian female rowers
Olympic rowers of Romania
Rowers at the 2000 Summer Olympics
Sportspeople from Suceava